Onna is a Local Government Area in Akwa Ibom State, Nigeria.

Onna may also refer to:
 Onna (L'Aquila), a town in Abruzzo, Italy
 Onna, Okinawa, Japan
 Onna, Hampshire, England, UK

People with the given name
 Onna White (1922–2005), Canadian choreographer and dancer

See also
 Ona (disambiguation)
 Onna-musha, a type of female warrior belonging to the Japanese upper class